Pedobacter ginsengisoli is a species of bacteria first isolated from a ginseng field, hence its name. It is Gram-negative, strictly aerobic, rod-shaped, non-motile and non-spore-forming bacterial strain with type strain Gsoil 104T  (=KCTC 12576T =LMG 23399T).

References

Further reading
Whitman, William B., et al., eds. Bergey's manual® of systematic bacteriology. Vol. 5. Springer, 2012.

External links

LPSN

Sphingobacteriia
Bacteria described in 2006